Ana Luisa Flôr Moura (born 21 January 1986) is a Portuguese badminton player from the Club Sports Madeira. Moura was the National Junior champion in the girls' singles and doubles event in 2004, and also in the girls' singles, doubles and mixed doubles event in 2005. At the National senior championships, she won once in the women's singles, three times in the women's doubles and two times in the mixed doubles event. In 2007, Moura won the singles title at the Iran and Algeria International tournaments, and in the doubles event at the Ecuador and Mauritius International tournaments. In the same year, she competed at the 2007 BWF World Championships in the women's singles, and was defeated in the second round by Xie Xingfang, of China, 21–2, 21–7. Moura also qualified to compete at the Beijing 2008 Summer Olympics, but she was defeated by Jeanine Cicognini of Switzerland in the first round with the score 21–9, 21–13.
Ana Moura is back on court. At the season 2018/2019 she is playing at Secção de Badminton - Associação Académica de Coimbra.

Achievements

BWF International Challenge/Series 
Women's singles

Women's doubles

 BWF International Challenge tournament
 BWF International Series tournament
 BWF Future Series tournament

References

External links 
 
 

Portuguese female badminton players
1986 births
Living people
Sportspeople from Funchal
Badminton players at the 2008 Summer Olympics
Olympic badminton players of Portugal